Run for Your Life  (also known as Marathon) is a 1988 Italian-British sport-drama film. It is the last film directed by Terence Young. It was shot in Rome;  during the filming Carradine married his third wife, Gail Jensen.

Cast 
 David Carradine	        as 	        Major Charles Forsythe 
 Lauren Hutton		as 		Sarah Forsythe
 George Segal		as 		Alan Morani 
 Franco Nero		as 		Commissare 
 Sabine Sun		as 		Ann Moorcroft 
 Anthony Dawson		as 		Colonel Moorcroft
 Gregg Stewart             as              Lieutenant Walker

References

External links

1988 films
1980s English-language films
Films directed by Terence Young
1988 drama films